Mark Meyer may refer to:

 Mark Meyer (politician) (born 1963), Wisconsin Democratic politician and legislator
 Mark A. Meyer (born 1946), American lawyer

See also
Mark Mayer (disambiguation)
Marc Meyer, American archaeologist
Marc Eugene Meyer (1842–1925), American businessman